is a former Japanese football player.

Playing career
Takahashi was born in Machida on September 29, 1980. After graduating from high school, he joined J1 League club Sanfrecce Hiroshima in 1999. He played many matches as forward from first season. However his opportunity to play decreased from 2002. In 2004, he moved to J2 League club Omiya Ardija. Although he played as substitute, he could not play many matches. In 2005, he moved to JEF United Chiba. However he could hardly play in the match. In 2006, he moved to Japan Football League (JFL) club Rosso Kumamoto (later Roasso Kumamoto). He played as regular player and scored many goals. The club was also promoted to J2 from 2008. In 2009, he moved to J2 club Avispa Fukuoka. He played many matches in 4 seasons. In 2013, he moved to J2 club Ehime FC. However he could not play many matches. In July 2013, he moved to JFL club Kamatamare Sanuki. He played many matches and the club was promoted to J2 from 2014. However his opportunity to play decreased from 2015 and he retired end of 2015 season.

Club statistics

1Includes 2013 J2/J3 playoff and 2014 J2/J3 playoff.

References

External links

1980 births
Living people
Association football people from Tokyo
Japanese footballers
J1 League players
J2 League players
Japan Football League players
Sanfrecce Hiroshima players
Omiya Ardija players
JEF United Chiba players
Roasso Kumamoto players
Avispa Fukuoka players
Ehime FC players
Kamatamare Sanuki players
Association football forwards